Santiago is a corregimiento in Santiago District, Veraguas Province, Panama with a population of 31,065 as of 2010. It is the seat of Santiago District. Its population as of 1990 was 43,874; its population as of 2000 was 32,480.

References

Corregimientos of Veraguas Province